Armin Vock (born 29 November 1952) is a Swiss gymnast. He competed in eight events at the 1976 Summer Olympics.

References

1952 births
Living people
Swiss male artistic gymnasts
Olympic gymnasts of Switzerland
Gymnasts at the 1976 Summer Olympics
Place of birth missing (living people)
20th-century Swiss people